Stictyosiphon tortilis is a species of alga belonging to the family Chordariaceae.

Synonym:
 Dictyosiphon tortilis (= basionym)
 Phloeospora tortilis (Gobi) Areschoug 1876
 Scytosiphon tortilis Ruprecht 1850
 Phloeospora pumila Kjellman 1877

References

Chordariaceae